Joseph Smeaton Chase (8 April 1864 – 29 March 1923) was an English-born American author, traveler, and photographer. He has become an integral part of California literature: revered for his poignant descriptions of California landscapes. An Englishman who toured the Santa Rosa and San Jacinto mountains in 1915 with his burro, Mesquit, Chase published poetic diary entries detailing his escapades through the Sierra Nevada mountains and California desert.

Life
Chase was born in Islington, now a London borough, in April 1864. He arrived in Southern California in 1890, although information surrounding his motive for doing so is sparse. It is known, however, that he lived on a mountainside and managed to obtain a job tutoring a wealthy rancher's children in the San Gabriel Valley. Chase was drawn to the plants, animals, and Spanish-speaking individuals who resided in California. Subsequently, in 1910 he took a trip with local painter Carl Eytel, travelling on horseback from Los Angeles to Laguna and then down to San Diego. Chase journeyed through the uncouth California land and detailed his escapades in his book California Desert Trails. He was passionate that the Santa Rosa and San Jacinto mountains be preserved as a national park. Chase appeals to readers who appreciate the unspoiled west and California history.

Chase died 29 March 1923, in Banning, California, after several years of poor health. His wife (Isabel, née White, 1876–1962) continued to live in Palm Springs. They are buried in the Welwood Murray Cemetery at the foot of Mt. San Jacinto in Palm Springs.  Also his name is engraved at his parents' (Samuel and Jane) headstone in the St. Mary the Virgin Cemetery, London Borough of Bexley, England.

Works

Books
By year first published:
   With illustrations by Carl Eytel
  With illustrations from Chase's photographs – details his route through in the strikingly beautiful Sierra Nevada. He captures the land and the people with such vibrancy that the reader is absorbed by his depictions of majestic California landscapes.
 
 
  (with introduction to this edition and updated plant list by Carl Sharsmith)
   In 1911, Chase journeyed 2,000 miles on horseback from Mexico to Oregon and intimately recorded his experiences along the way. In his journals, Chase poetically provides a glimpse of California's towns and wilderness as they appeared at the beginning of the 20th century.
 
  (with introduction to this edition by John McKinney; updated plant list by Mabel Crittenden)
 
  With illustrations from Chase's photographs. Available at:  Internet Archive: California Coast Trails
  (with introduction to this edition by Richard Dillon; environmental perspective and updated plant list by Robert L. Moon)
  (Electronic copy) One of the first travel books of Palm Springs and the Coachella Valley. Describes the animals, plants, and Native Americans that resided in Palm Springs before it was transformed into a posh resort town.

Journals, co-author, and other
 
  (Available as  pdf file from the HathiTrust Digital Library)
 
  (Available as a pdf file from the HathiTrust Digital Library)

Notes

Further reading

 
 
 
   – cites Chase and includes his photograph Sunset Time of Rosa and Marcos Belardo of the Agua Caliente Band of Cahuilla Indians.

External links

 
 
 
 
 Taquitz Canyon, Palm Springs, of which Chase wrote
 5 short radio segments based on Chase's writing at California Legacy Project

20th-century American writers
English emigrants to the United States
American photographers
Burials at Welwood Murray Cemetery
Writers from Palm Springs, California
People from Banning, California
Yosemite National Park
1864 births
1923 deaths